Timothy John Piazza (September 25, 1997  February 4, 2017) died as the result of hazing at the Beta Theta Pi fraternity at Pennsylvania State University at University Park, Pennsylvania. The incident led to closure of the fraternity's chapter at the university, and at least 26 members of the fraternity had charges of involuntary manslaughter dropped by a presiding judge. The initial investigation was led by Centre County District Attorney Stacy Parks Miller and Special Investigator Bruce Castor.

The death of Tim Piazza led to the largest criminal indictment against a fraternity and its members in American history. More than 1,000 counts were levied against 18 members of Beta Theta Pi, including eight who were charged with involuntary manslaughter and aggravated assault. Additional charges were added later. Piazza's death became a 'turning point' for America's fraternities.

Background 

In 2005, Penn State alumnus Donald G. Abbey, a member of Joe Paterno's first ever Penn State Nittany Lions football scholarship class and Beta Theta Pi alumnus, donated $1.2 million to renovate the Beta Theta Pi house. In 2006, Abbey raised another $3.5 million in renovation funds. This would go on to become the most expensive fraternity house renovation in American history. The renovation was lauded by Paterno and his wife, Sue Paterno. Throughout the renovation process, fraternity brothers smashed holes in the walls with baseball bats, leading Abbey to predict future damage to the property. He was a staunch critic of hazing, and due to the toxic culture he found in Beta Theta Pi, he installed an extensive video surveillance system to ensure he would be notified if an emergency situation ever occurred on the property.

The Penn State chapter of Beta Theta Pi was known to have a deep history of hazing. Brothers once held a party on their front porch, yelling racial slurs at an African American Penn State student as he walked past the house. The house was once banned for having a front yard littered with used condoms along with hot sauce covering the entire Great Hall.

In September 2016, a pledge named Kordel Davis was driven to a clinic after a night of hazing that left a gash on his head. A fraternity brother nicknamed "Pajamas" saw Davis in a desperate state, and Davis asked "Pajamas" to drive him back to his dorm room. "Pajamas" texted Pledge Master Brendan Young this information, in which Young replied, "Who? Cordell . Not worth it."

Hazing incident 

Piazza was a 19-year-old sophomore engineering student at Pennsylvania State University. He was a pledge of the Beta Theta Pi fraternity at the university. On the night of February 2, 2017, while undergoing hazing activities for the fraternity, Piazza, on an essentially empty stomach, drank large amounts of alcohol in a short time as part of an obstacle course called "The Gauntlet", which required each pledge to drink from a bottle of vodka, drink a beer, and finally drink from a bag of wine. It later was revealed that Piazza took prescription anti-depressants, which contributed to his inebriation. The fraternity was supposed to be alcohol-free after a suspension in 2009.

In this state of intoxication, he fell on the basement stairs of the house and was knocked unconscious. He was carried to a couch, where surveillance cameras captured a conspicuous bruise that bloomed on his left abdomen; however, this was shown to have originated from another one of the alcohol-fueled rush events for fraternities that Piazza had attended a week earlier. Jonah Neuman, Lars Kenyon, and Edward Gilmartin colluded in prohibiting witnesses from calling 9-1-1. Neuman threw someone against a wall, Gilmartin labeled witnesses crazy and insane, whilst Kenyon downplayed the concerns of witnesses in group chats.

Some time later, Piazza regained consciousness and rolled off the couch. Three brothers picked him up and placed him back on the couch. Security footage shows them poking Piazza in the face, to determine if he was okay, but he remained unconscious and unresponsive. Kordel Davis, a newly initiated fraternity chapter member, attempted to render aid to Piazza, encouraging fraternity members to dial 9-1-1 and get an ambulance to the house. He was shoved up against a wall and his attempts were ignored.

At around 3:30 am on February 3, 2017, Piazza tried to get up, but once he reached a standing position, fell backward. He continued to stand up only to repeatedly fall back down. Once he was finally able to maintain balance, he staggered toward the lobby area of the house, but fell again headfirst into an iron railing and landed on a stone floor, likely incurring serious head trauma. He got up and tried to reach the front door but fell headfirst into it, knocking himself unconscious again. He later tried once more to ascend the basement stairs and was missing until several of the fraternity brothers discovered him several hours later behind the bar in the basement, cold and breathing rapidly.

It was at this point that he was carried upstairs. After several minutes of debating on what the next step should be, the conclusion was made that Piazza's injuries were indeed serious and that he would require medical attention. Before emergency assistance arrived, the brothers wiped blood from his face and attempted to dress him in an effort to warm him. Soon emergency services arrived and Piazza was brought to Mount Nittany Medical Center, but was quickly transported to Penn State Milton S. Hershey Medical Center because of the severity of his injuries.

Upon arrival, Piazza was rushed into surgery, where he was discovered to have a ruptured spleen and class IV hemorrhagic shock. His brain had swollen to the point that roughly half of his skull had to be removed to relieve the pressure. The surgeons attempting to save his life deemed the injuries to likely be nonrecoverable, and Piazza was pronounced dead in the early morning of February 4, 2017. He is estimated to have had a blood alcohol content of nearly 0.40 on the night of the hazing incident.

Brendan Young claimed that after the hazing incident, Piazza "looked fucking dead".

Criminal prosecutions 

The Piazza case resulted in one of the largest hazing prosecutions in US history. On May 5, 2017, following a comprehensive grand jury investigation conducted by Centre County District Attorney Stacy Parks Miller, eighteen members of the fraternity were charged in connection with Piazza's death: eight were charged with involuntary manslaughter and the rest with other offenses, including hazing.

In addition to the fraternity brothers, the Beta Theta Pi fraternity itself was also charged. Its Penn State fraternity branch was closed after its president ordered it banned from campus indefinitely. , the fraternity and its eighteen members faced a combined total of more than 850 criminal charges.

In October 2018, Michael Angelo Schiavone pleaded guilty to conspiracy to commit furnishing alcohol to minors. Investigators discovered texts in which Schiavone admitted to operating the fraternity's “Slush Fund.” Schiavone states the “Slush Fund” was utilized to purchase alcohol for the fraternity's parties.

Alleged perpetrators 

Prosecutors have filed the following charges in relation to this crime and its cover-up:
 Daniel Casey (age 19): 201 counts, including involuntary manslaughter; charges reduced to reckless endangerment, hazing, and furnishing alcohol to a minor
 Brendan Young (age 21): 200 counts, including involuntary manslaughter; charges reduced to reckless endangerment, hazing, and furnishing alcohol to a minor
 Jonah Neuman (age 19): 79 counts, including involuntary manslaughter; charges reduced to reckless endangerment, hazing, and furnishing alcohol to a minor
 Lars Kenyon (age 19): 52 counts, including reckless endangerment; charges reduced to furnishing alcohol to a minor
 Michelangelo Schiavone (age 21): 52 counts, including reckless endangerment; charges reduced to hazing and furnishing alcohol
 Nick Kubera (age 19): more than 50 counts, including involuntary manslaughter; charges reduced to hazing and furnishing alcohol 
 Ryan Foster (age 21): one count of tampering with evidence 
 Edward Gilmartin (age 20): one count of tampering with evidence

Tampering with evidence and endangerment charges have also been dismissed against three other students, Joseph Ems (ghost brother and leader of dangerous hazing events in the Fall of 2016), Ryan McCann, and Lucas Rockwell.

On November 14, 2017, ten more members were charged in connection with Piazza's death. The new charges were filed after the Centre County District Attorney announced that the Federal Bureau of Investigation had recovered video showing that Piazza had been given at least 18 drinks in an 82-minute span, and that the video had been intentionally deleted. The additional defendants are:

 Joshua Kurczewski (age 19): eight counts; including involuntary manslaughter, hazing, and furnishing alcohol to a minor
 Ryan Burke (age 21): eight counts; including involuntary manslaughter, hazing, and furnishing alcohol to a minor; pleaded guilty on June 13, 2018
 Jonathan Kanzler (age 19): eight counts; including involuntary manslaughter, hazing, and furnishing alcohol to a minor
 Aiden O'Brien: eight counts; including involuntary manslaughter, hazing, and furnishing alcohol to a minor
 Brian Gelb: three counts; including hazing, furnishing alcohol to a minor, and unlawful acts relative to liquor
 Patrick Jackson: three counts; including hazing, furnishing alcohol to a minor, and unlawful acts relative to liquor
 Reggie Goeke: three counts; including hazing, furnishing alcohol to a minor, and unlawful acts relative to liquor
 Mike Fernandez: three counts; including hazing, furnishing alcohol to a minor, and unlawful acts relative to liquor
 Donald Prior: three counts; including hazing, furnishing alcohol to a minor, and unlawful acts relative to liquor

Ems (age 19) now has additional charges against him—hazing, furnishing alcohol to a minor, and unlawful acts relative to liquor stemming all the way back to forcing a pledge to drink mass amounts of alcohol in September 2016, sending him to a clinic with blood gushing out of his forehead. Braxton Becker (age 20), who had the charge of tampering with evidence dropped against him, was charged with it again (and later acquitted) after new footage suggested he deleted the footage that led to these new charges. Becker was also charged with (and acquitted of) obstructing administration of law and charged with (and convicted of) hindering apprehension. On November 1, 2017, Lars Kenyon claimed "the judge got it right" and Kenyon has to "[figure] some stuff out".   , at least 26 members face charges.

Commonwealth of Pennsylvania v. Beta Theta Pi - Alpha Upsilon et al. 

On August 11, 2017, on the fifth day of the preliminary hearing, it was announced by lead investigators that basement footage from the bid acceptance on February 2, 2017, had in fact been deleted by a defendant already charged in the case. Lead prosecutor Centre County District Attorney Stacy Parks Miller noted that additional charges would be filed as a result of this finding.

That same day, defense attorneys for a number of the defendants started to put blame on Tim Bream, the Penn State Nittany Lions football head athletic trainer and Beta Theta Pi live-in advisor. He was present during the night of Tim Piazza's bid acceptance, although he has never been charged in the case. After unsuccessful attempts by attorneys to have Bream subpoenaed, the judge in the case ordered that Bream have his own hearing on possible contempt of court and avoiding his subpoena.

On February 8, 2019, Parks Miller received a law license suspension of one year and one day for communicating improperly with judges and defense attorneys. Parks Miller was defended by Bruce Castor throughout the trial.    Former DA Parks Miller was reinstated to practice law in September 2021. She is currently a practicing attorney in Centre County, Pennsylvania.

Media coverage

Initial coverage 
The case attracted a significant amount of national media attention, and was regularly the main topic of many TV talk shows; including Good Morning America, The Today Show, CBS This Morning and on CNN.

Thomas R. Kline, the lawyer for the Piazza family, was featured on talk shows extensively.

On May 16, 2017, Mehmet Oz appeared on The Today Show to discuss warning signs of dangerous binge drinking. Mr. Oz (Dr. Oz) became the (unsuccessful) Republican candidate for the 2022 United States Senate election in Pennsylvania.

On June 12, 2017, Nancy Grace discussed the case on her podcast.

The case was the headline of a number of magazine articles. On November 15, 2017, Caitlin Flanagan published the article "Death at a Penn State Fraternity" in The Atlantic. The Atlantic article pointed out the ties between Beta Theta Pi and Joe Paterno. Vanity Fair published the article "How a Fatal Frat Hazing Became Penn State's Latest Campus Crisis" on October 3, 2017. Time magazine published the article "'Those Families Are Changed Forever.' A Deadly Year in Fraternity Hazing Comes to a Close"

The New York Times extensively covered the case including articles "18 Penn State Students Charged in Fraternity Death", "Prosecutors Taking Tougher Stance in Fraternity Hazing Deaths", and "Penn State Student's Dying Hours Play Out in Courtroom Video".

On February 2, 2018, Vice News published the documentary "Penn State is Still Keeping Secrets on Frat Row".

Hulu miniseries 
On October 10, 2022, it was reported that Robert Greenblatt is developing a Hulu miniseries entitled “Death at Penn State” based on the Caitlin Flanagan  article in The Atlantic magazine based on the events surrounding the Piazza case.

Guilty plea 

One of the fraternity brothers charged in the death of Piazza pleaded guilty on June 13, 2018, to nine charges, making him the first in the case to enter a guilty plea. Ryan Burke, age 21, pleaded guilty to four counts of hazing and five counts relating to unlawful acts involving liquor in the deadly injuries Piazza sustained following a night of heavy drinking and hazing. Burke was accused of giving Piazza a bottle of vodka at the Beta Theta Pi party. Burke admitted his role in the hazing of Piazza, which included being present for and actively encouraging a gauntlet of drinking games and an obstacle course involving Piazza and other pledges.

On July 31, 2018, Burke was sentenced to three months of house arrest for his role in the hazing death of Piazza. He pleaded guilty to nine misdemeanor charges, including four counts of hazing and five counts involving unlawful acts related to alcoholic beverages. In addition to the house arrest, Burke was sentenced to 27 months of probation and was ordered to pay fines, costs, and restitution.

Timothy J. Piazza Anti-Hazing Law 

The Grand Jury that recommended charges against the brothers also directed Centre County District Attorney Stacy Parks Miller to investigate Penn State University and their role and response to hazing. During many months of testimony from multiple witnesses, including former pledges and others with first-hand experience, the Grand Jury collected evidence about the University's response and handling of hazing across the board. The Grand Jury received testimony regarding the prior Penn State fraternity hazing related death of Joe Dado and a suicide linked to hazing pressures at the Altoona branch of Penn State. Witnesses aware of the ongoing hazing and extreme drinking over the years say they notified Penn State authorities but little was done, despite extensive records documenting the hazing, abuse, and other dangerous behavior. Pledges that testified confirmed that hazing had become routine behind the closed doors of the fraternity houses with Penn State turning a blind eye and adopting a hands-off approach.

The testimony revealed that pledges were routinely forced to drink to the extreme and potentially deadly levels, brothers would physically and mentally abuse pledges including physical violence and sleep deprivation. More extreme behaviors including sexual, physical, and emotional abuse and the killing of small animals were documented. The pledges were threatened if they told anyone of the activities, there would be consequences. As a result of this evidence, the Grand Jury released a scathing 236-page report regarding hazing and excessive alcohol consumption at Penn State fraternities.

The Report recommended sweeping changes to Pennsylvania's hazing law and Penn State's inadequate manner of handling hazing. The Report called for the legislature to establish "Tim's Law", creating more severe punishments for hazing. It directed Penn State to strengthen their hazing policies. The report recommended a zero-tolerance policy against those who violate hazing law and the implementation and enforcement of severe restrictions for underage drinking. The Report recommended strengthening laws against furnishing alcohol to minors and that Penn State create a "pledge's bill of rights" that outlines acceptable and unacceptable behavior during the pledge process. Finally, the report recommended that Penn State establish a confidential hazing hotline.

In response to the Report's recommendations, released by District Attorney Stacy Parks Miller on December 15, 2017, on March 27, 2018, "The Timothy J. Piazza Anti-Hazing Law" was unanimously approved by the Pennsylvania State Senate Judiciary Committee. Pennsylvania Senate Majority Leader Jake Corman (Republican, Benner Township) and Piazza's parents, Jim and Evelyn Piazza, introduced the bill on March 23, 2018, at the courthouse in Bellefonte. 

The bill would create tiers for hazing. Hazing resulting in serious bodily injury or death would be a third-degree felony, which could include fines of up to $15,000 and imprisonment up to seven years. Hazing resulting in bodily injury would be a third-degree misdemeanor, which could include fines of up to $2,500 and imprisonment up to one year. Other hazing would be a summary offense. The bill would also establish "organizational" and "institutional" hazing categories. 

"The bill has been carefully crafted because we want this to be a model for changing anti-hazing laws nationwide", Corman said. "My intent with this legislation is clear  to prevent death or serious injury due to hazing so that families, such as Tim's, never experience tragedies like this ever again." 

The anti-hazing legislation was subsequently submitted for consideration in the full state Senate.

On April 18, 2018, the Pennsylvania State Senate unanimously passed the bill, which would make hazing in fraternities a third-degree felony in cases of serious injury or death, and could allow universities to seize offending Greek organizations' houses. 

The law is sponsored by Republican Senate Majority Leader and 34th Senatorial District Rep. Jake Corman, who worked with Tim Piazza's family to create the bill. It defines hazing as coercing an individual to participate in any illegal activity in order to join a social group, including the use of drugs and alcohol to inflict physical or emotional harm or the use of other forces such as "whipping, beating ... or extreme embarrassment".

Lawmakers named the anti-hazing legislation after Timothy Piazza.

Timothy J. Piazza's Law
On August 24, 2021, New Jersey Governor Phil Murphy signed into law S84/2093, requiring public and non-public middle schools and high schools, as well as higher education institutions, to adopt anti-hazing policies and penalties for violations of the policies. S84/2093 is nicknamed the “Timothy J. Piazza Law” after Timothy Piazza.

Advocates of the law include:

 New Jersey Department of Education Acting Commissioner Angelica Allen-McMillan, Ed.D.
New Jersey Secretary of Higher Education Dr. Brian Bridges
Acting New Jersey Attorney General Andrew Bruck
New Jersey Senator Kip Bateman
New Jersey Senator Troy Singleton
New Jersey Senator Linda R. Greenstein
New Jersey Senate Minority Leader Tom Keane, Jr.
With Timothy J. Piazza's Law in effect, hazing in New Jersey is upgraded from a fourth-degree crime to a third-degree crime when it results in death or serious bodily injury; and hazing in New Jersey is upgraded from a disorderly persons offense to a fourth-degree crime if it results in bodily injury.

Educational response 

Legal scholars continually point to the Piazza case as a grounds for change in Hazing Prevention legislation. The Journal of College and University Law, published in conjunction with Rutgers Law School, analyzed the Pennsylvania laws created out of the Piazza case and determined that not enough legal changes have yet been made.

A number of sociologists and psychologists pointed towards the prevalence of groupthink in the Piazza case. This scenario has been analyzed in a number of intellectual books, including Discover Sociology: Core Concepts and Harvard University Press's Why We Act: Turning Bystanders Into Moral Rebels.

The Chronicle of Higher Education pointed out that four pledges died in 2017 alone, but the added media coverage the Piazza case has attracted can help lead to monumental change for the first time.

In 2020, the Villanova University School of Law analyzed a Penn State Football Hazing lawsuit in which a victim sued Head Coach James Franklin. The scholars, of the Moorad Sports Law Journal, point to the “Timothy J. Piazza” law as precedent and indicate that 95% of college students don't report hazing. The scholars believe that the student who sued Coach Franklin should be taken seriously given the new Pennsylvania Anti-Hazing laws created out of the Piazza case.

Aftermath 

On September 1, 2017, defendant Joseph G. Ems appeared on ABC News with his lawyer. He has since been sued by the Piazza family.

Jim and Evelyn Piazza have gone on to speak to thousands of college students all throughout the United States in an effort to end hazing on campuses.

Kordel Davis led a Hazing Prevention tour in the Fall of 2019 entitled "One Night a Pledge".

Penn State settled with the Piazza family to avoid further civil litigation.

Tim Bream, the Penn State Nittany Lions football Head Athletic Trainer, attempted to sue Penn State for wrongful termination but the judge ruled against him, citing prescription drugs being stolen right out of his work desk. In March 2021, Bream sued Penn State a second time, claiming the university violated his contract and created "intolerable" working conditions as a result of his role in the Beta Theta Pi house.

On March 30, 2021, settlements were reached with 25 defendants and third party defendants in civil suits.

Penn State President Eric J. Barron attempted to transform Penn State's Greek life system following Piazza's death; he announced his retirement in June 2022. In March 2023, an internal memo was leaked by the press indicating Penn State holds desires to go back to the Greek life culture pre-Death of Tim Piazza.

In December 2021, Centre County Judge Brian Marshall ruled that Penn State can take ownership of the Beta Theta Pi house.

See also 

 Beta Theta Pi  Incidents
 List of hazing deaths in the United States
 Matt's Law

References

Further reading 

 
 Penn State frat pledge's skin had turned gray by morning after fall, prosecutor says
Davis, Kordel (September 14, 2020). "Fraternity Membership: a Death Wish". Medium.
 A Penn State student fell down the stairs at a fraternity — and for nearly 12 hours, no one called police
 Fraternity, 18 members charged in Penn State student's death
 18 Penn State Students Charged in Fraternity Death
 Swofford, Justin J. (August 2020) The Hazing Triangle: Reconceiving the Crime of Fraternity Hazing (discussing Piazza incident and critiquing subsequent antihazing law)

External links 
 Obituary for Timothy Piazza
 In Memory of Timothy Piazza
 Charging documents
 Criminal complaint
 Hank Nuwer's List of Deaths by Hazing
 Grand Jury Report

2017 in Pennsylvania
Beta Theta Pi
Crimes in Pennsylvania
Deaths by person in Pennsylvania
Education issues
February 2017 crimes in the United States
February 2017 events in the United States
Hazing
Pennsylvania State University
Rites of passage
University folklore